Uganda Cup 2017-18 was the 43rd edition of the main Ugandan football Cup.

Format
The competition had 64 teams, of which the teams in the Uganda Premier League and FUFA Big League qualified automatically for the first round. The other teams were filled out through a series of regional competitions. The competition ran between January 20 and June 15.

Overview
The competition was won by KCCA FC who defeated Paidha Black Angels 2-0 in the final, held in Arua.

Awards
Paidha Black Angels' Emmanuel Rubangakene won the best goalkeeper award.

Footnotes

External links
 Uganda - List of Cup Finals - RSSSF (Mikael Jönsson, Ian King and Hans Schöggl)

Ugandan Cup
Uganda Cup
Cup
Cup